Kistrand is a village in Porsanger Municipality in Troms og Finnmark county, Norway. It is located on the eastern side of the Porsanger Peninsula, along the western shore of the Porsangerfjorden.

History
Kistrand was the name of Porsanger Municipality from 1 January 1838 until 1 January 1964 when it was changed to Porsanger.  The municipality was named after the parish of Kistrand, based at the Kistrand Church which is in this village. Originally (in 1838), Kistrand municipality was very large and it encompassed the contemporary municipalities of Porsanger, Nordkapp, Kautokeino, and Karasjok.

References

Villages in Finnmark
Porsanger
Populated places of Arctic Norway